Fancher is a surname. Notable people with the surname include:

Albert T. Fancher (1859–1930), American politician
Bruce Fancher (born 1971), American computer hacker
Frederick B. Fancher (1852–1944), American politician
Hampton Fancher (born 1938), American actor
Houston Fancher (born 1966), American basketball coach
Jane Fancher (born 1952), American science fiction writer
Louis Fancher (1884–1944), American artist
Raymond Fancher (born 1940), American psychologist and historian